Oserian (Masai, "Place of Peace"; locally, The Gin Palace; later, Djinn Palace) is a flower farm on the south shores of Lake Naivasha, Nakuru County, Kenya. It is Africa's largest rose producer. 

History
Originally a country estate, the Moorish-style mansion was built in 1927 by Major Cyril Ramsay-Hill, a rancher, former officer in an Indian regiment, and sometime Hollywood actor. It was based on his grandmother's home in Seville, Spain.
The crenellated and domed building features minarets, and contains an "inner courtyard, fountains, squash court, swimming pool, and polo grounds".

During the colonial era, "The Djinn Palace" was "where things usually were very lively" for the Happy Valley set, according to Ulf Aschan. It was built for Ramsay-Hill's wife, Molly (née Edith Mildred Maude; 1893–1939), who had an affair with and later married Josslyn Hay, 22nd Earl of Erroll.

In 1969, Oserian was established as a small vegetable growing farm. 
In 1982, it became the first flower farm on Lake Naivasha.

Tax avoidance
In 2020 it was reported that Dutch firms who were growing cut flowers in Kenya using addresses in Amsterdam to avoid tax on large turnovers. Prof. Attiya Waris who had studied this industry noted they are using Kenyan land but they are avoiding paying for it. Investigators (Investico) had found by using Kenyan data and the Panama Papers that companies like Oserian were avoiding tax. Oserian was using trusts in Liechtenstein and the British Virgin Islands in 2011 to avoid nearly all tax in Kenya despite a 47 million Euro turnover.

External links
 Official website

References

Houses in Kenya
Nakuru County
Farms in Kenya
Agricultural organisations based in Kenya
Buildings and structures in Rift Valley Province
Houses completed in 1927